Hines Creek is a village in northern Alberta, Canada. It is located 67 km west of Grimshaw and 28 km north of Fairview, along Highway 64.

Demographics 

Education 
Hines Creek Composite School is the only school in Hines Creek and features Grade K-12. It is administered by the Peace River School Division.

Post secondary education is available in the neighbouring town of Fairview at Grande Prairie Regional Fairview Campus.

See also 
List of communities in Alberta
List of villages in Alberta

References

External links 

1951 establishments in Alberta
Villages in Alberta